Parala Maharaja Engineering College (PMEC), Brahmapur, Odisha is Government engineering college in southern Odisha, India. Established in 2009, the college was inaugurated by Naveen Patnaik, the then chief minister of Odisha. This college is named after the King Krushna Chandra Gajapati honorably known as Maharaja Sir Krushna Chandra Gajapati Narayana Dev KCIE, was a key personality and regarded as the architect of an Independent united Odisha State. The Parala Maharaja engineering College was approved by the All India Council of Technical Education (AICTE) New Delhi, Govt. of India and was affiliated to Biju Patnaik University of Technology (BPUT), Rourkela, Government of Odisha but now, it is an autonomous college from 21st January, 2021 along with GCE, Kalahandi and GCE, Keonjhar. This college is also accredited as "B+" by the National Board of Accreditation (NBA) New Delhi, Govt. of India.

Academic structure 
The college provides four-year Bachelor of Technology degrees in nine disciplines of engineering:  civil, computer science, automobile, production, chemical, metallurgy and material, electronics and telecommunication, mechanical, and electrical engineering.

A three-year B.Tech degree for student who has completed their Diploma. All courses are full-time.

Each academic year consists of two semesters and a summer term. The education is organized around a credit system, which ensures continuous evaluation of a student's performance and provides flexibility to choose courses to suit the student's ability or convenience. Each course is assigned credits depending upon the class hours.

The college also provides M.Tech degrees in five disciplines: Mechanical engineering, Power system engineering, Structural engineering, Production engineering and Thermal engineering, since 2015.

Laboratories

Facilities 

 Two workshop buildings.
 Two hostels for boys (Kalam hall of residence); one for girls (Mahanadi hall of residence). One boys hostel and one girls hostel are under construction.
 Library & Reference section for study purpose.
 Multimedia Digital Language Laboratory with Computer Assisted Language Learning (CALL) facilities has been set up in the department to develop the English language proficiency of the students in association with IIT Kharagpur.
The college has a utility building and bank (syndicate bank) and a building for guests.
Large playground for student and faculty members.
Open gym facilities for all

Admission
The admission to B.Tech courses is done through OJEE conducted each year. Lateral entry admissions after diploma is made through OJEE conducted each year by the Government of Odisha.

The admission to M.Tech courses is done through GATE entrance exam.

The students are placed in IOCL, BPCL, ONGC, NTPC, HPCL, BARC and state-level engineering services (AEE) of Odisha.

Examination
Registration is required at the beginning of each semester. Students appear for examination for registered courses only. Students are eligible to appear for examinations provided they attend a minimum of 75 percent of their theory, practical and sessional classes scheduled during the semester.

Events
 EXUBERANCE is the college's cultural extravaganza held annually in March.
 TYRUS is the freshers' party.
 ANSALONAE is the annual technical festival.
 ARENA is the athletic meet.
 DARBAR is the annual magazine.

Departments 
 Automobile Engineering (60)
 Civil Engineering (120)
 Chemical Engineering (60)
 Computer Science and Engineering (60)
 Electrical Engineering (120)
 Electronics and Telecommunication Engineering (60)
 Mechanical Engineering (120)
 Production Engineering (30)
Material and Metallurgy Engineering (30)
 Science and Humanities (Physics, Chemistry, Maths, English, Economics & Management)

Clubs
ROBOSTREAKS
WRITERIA
SHADOW
CADENCE
FLAMINGO
NSS
NCC
DRAMATIC CLUB
IMAGICS

References

External links 

 Official website
 BPUT website
 http://www.bputstudents.com/bput/Rank/index.php

Engineering colleges in Odisha
Colleges affiliated with Biju Patnaik University of Technology
Education in Berhampur
Educational institutions established in 2009
2009 establishments in Orissa